John Diarse (born December 10, 1994) is an American football wide receiver for the Massachusetts Pirates. He was signed by the Denver Broncos as an undrafted free agent in 2018. He played college football at LSU and TCU.

Early life
Growing up in Monroe, Louisiana, Diarse was a football star at Neville High School, playing quarterback and safety for the Tigers.  As a senior in 2012, he led the Tigers to the Louisiana Class 4A state championship game, was named Mr. Louisiana Football and selected to play in the US Army All-American Bowl.

College career

LSU
After graduating high school a semester early, Diarse enrolled at Louisiana State University on January 11, 2013.  He redshirted in the 2013 season before totalling 28 receptions for 412 yards and 3 touchdowns playing wide receiver for the Tigers in the 2014 and 2015 seasons. After graduating from LSU in three years with a degree in sports administration, Diarse transferred to TCU in Fort Worth, Texas.

TCU
Diarse started 21 games in his two seasons at TCU, totalling 68 receptions for 1,017 yards and 6 touchdowns.  As a senior, he helped lead the Frogs to the program's first-ever berth in the Big 12 Championship Game and a win in the 2017 Alamo Bowl over Stanford.  He graduated from TCU with master's degree in 2017.

Professional career

Denver Broncos
After going undrafted in the 2018 NFL Draft, Diarse signed with the Denver Broncos on May 1, 2018 as an undrafted free agent. He totaled 4 receptions for 68 yards playing in three Broncos' preseason games, but was released by the team during final team cuts on August 31.

San Antonio Commanders
On January 4, 2019, Diarse signed with the San Antonio Commanders of the Alliance of American Football. The league ceased operations in April 2019.

References

External links
 LSU Tigers bio
 TCU Horned Frogs bio

1994 births
Living people
American football wide receivers
Denver Broncos players
LSU Tigers football players
Players of American football from Louisiana
San Antonio Commanders players
Sportspeople from Monroe, Louisiana
TCU Horned Frogs football players
Massachusetts Pirates players